Aleuritopteris albomarginata is an herbal plant used in Nepal and India.

References

Flora of Nepal
albomarginata